The Autódromo Internacional de Codegua is a  race track located in Codegua, O'Higgins Region, Chile,  northeast of the city of Rancagua, and  south of Santiago.

It is the one of the main race tracks in Chile, regularly hosting Chilean national race competitions, as well as being open for private use.

It hosted the prestigious Argentinian category Súper TC 2000 in 2014, and there were some chances to host a MotoGP race in the past.

See also
 Rancagua

References

External links
 AIC official website
 

Codegua
Codegua
Codegua
Codegua